The 2009 UCI Women's Road World Cup was the 12th edition of the UCI Women's Road World Cup. The calendar contained the same races as the 2008 event with the exception of the Geelong World Cup, meaning that the campaign began instead in Italy.

Races

Final points standings

Individuals

Teams

UCI Women's Teams

References

 
UCI Women's Road World Cup
UCI Women's Road World Cup